The Picts were a group of peoples who lived in Britain north of the Forth–Clyde isthmus in the Pre-Viking, Early Middle Ages. Where they lived and details of their culture can be inferred from early medieval texts and Pictish stones. The term  appears in written records as an exonym from the late third century CE, but was adopted as an endonym in the late seventh century during the Verturian hegemony. This lasted around 160 years until the succession of the Alpínid dynasty, when the Pictish kingdom merged with that of Dál Riata to form the Kingdom of Alba. The concept of "Pictish kingship" continued for a few decades until it was abandoned entirely as a contemporary signifier during the reign of Caustantín mac Áeda.

Early medieval sources report the existence of a distinct Pictish language, which is thought to have been an Insular Celtic language, closely related to the Brittonic spoken by the Britons who lived to the south. Picts are assumed to have been the descendants of the Caledonii and other Iron Age tribes that were mentioned by Roman historians or on the world map of Ptolemy.

Pictish society was typical of many early mediaeval societies in northern Europe and had parallels with neighbouring groups. Archaeology gives some impression of the society of the Picts. While very little in the way of Pictish writing has survived, much of its history is known from external sources, including Bede's Historia ecclesiastica gentis Anglorum, saints' lives such as that of Columba by Adomnán, and the Irish annals.

Definitions
There has been substantial critical reappraisal of the concept of "Pictishness" over recent decades. The popular view of the Picts at the beginning of the twentieth century was that they were exotic "lost people". It was noted in the highly influential work of 1955, The Problem of the Picts, that the subject matter was difficult, with the archaeological and historical record frequently being at odds with the conventional essentialist expectations about historical peoples. Since then, the culture-historical paradigm of archaeology that had been dominant since the late nineteenth century gave way to the processual archaeology theory, formerly known as the New Archaeology. The difficulties with Pictish archaeology were due to the fact that the people who were called Picts were a fundamentally heterogeneous group with little in the way of cultural uniformity. Care needs to be taken to avoid viewing the subject through the lens of what Gilbert Márkus calls the Ethnic Fallacy. The people who were called "Picts" by outsiders in late antiquity were very different from those who later adopted it for themselves, in terms of language, culture, religion and politics.

The term "Pict" originated around the end of the third century as a Latin, non-ethnic term (exonym) used to describe "barbarians" in northern Britain. The term is most likely to have been pejorative, deriding the perceived barbarism of an unromanised people. The term was used in Gildas' De Excidio et Conquestu Britanniae, after which there exists a gap in its use. It was ultimately adopted by the Verturian hegemony, centered in Fortriu (the area around modern-day Inverness and Moray), as a collective, inclusive endonym following the Battle of Dun Nechtain. It is in this sense that the Irish Annalists and contemporary scholars like Bede, use the term, to describe the peoples of North and Eastern Scotland, to the exclusion of the Dál Riatans, the Britons of South Western Scotland and the Northumbrian Angles of Lothian. Its use continued to the formation of the Alpinid dynasty in the ninth century, and the merging of the Kingdom of the Picts with the Kingdom of Dál Riata.

Etymology

Greek  , 'picture'). This is generally understood to be a reference to the practice of tattooing. Tattooing is understood to have been practised by the Caledonians at the time of the campaign of Septimius Severus in 208, as reported by Herodian. Claudian, in his account of the Roman commander Stilicho, written around 404, speaks of designs on the bodies of dying Picts, presumably referring to tattoos or body paint. Isidore of Seville reports in the early seventh century that the practice was continued by the Picts. While this seems logical, an alternative suggestion is that the Latin Picti was derived from a native form, perhaps related etymologically to the Gallic Pictones.

The Picts were called Cruithni in Old Irish and Prydyn in Old Welsh. These are lexical cognates, from the proto-Celtic *kwritu 'form', from which *Pretania (Britain) also derives. Pretani (and with it Cruithni and Prydyn) is likely to have originated as a generalised term for any native inhabitant of Britain. This is similar to the situation with the Gaelic name of Scotland, Alba, which originally seems to have been a generalised term for Britain. It has been proposed that the Picts may have called themselves Albidosi, a name found in the Chronicle of the Kings of Alba during the reign of Máel Coluim mac Domnaill.

History

Origin myths presented in the Pictish Chronicle, the Anglo-Saxon Chronicle and the works of early historiographers such as Bede
present the Picts as invading conquerors from Scythia. However, no credence is now given to that view. The area occupied by the Picts had previously been described by Roman writers and geographers as the home of the Caledonii. These Romans also used other names to refer to tribes living in that area, including Verturiones, Taexali and Venicones.

Written history relating to the Picts as a people emerges in the Early Middle Ages. At that time, the Gaels of Dál Riata controlled what is now Argyll, as part of a kingdom straddling the sea between Britain and Ireland. The Angles of Bernicia, which merged with Deira to form Northumbria, overwhelmed the adjacent British kingdoms, and for much of the 7th century Northumbria was the most powerful kingdom in Britain. The Picts were probably tributary to Northumbria until the reign of Bridei mac Beli, when, in 685, the Anglians suffered a defeat at the Battle of Dun Nechtain that halted their northward expansion. The Northumbrians continued to dominate southern Scotland for the remainder of the Pictish period.

Dál Riata was subject to the Pictish king Óengus mac Fergusa during his reign (729–761), and though it had its own kings beginning in the 760s, does not appear to have recovered its political independence from the Picts. A later Pictish king, Caustantín mac Fergusa (793–820), placed his son Domnall on the throne of Dál Riata (811–835). Pictish attempts to achieve a similar dominance over the Britons of Alt Clut (Dumbarton) were not successful.

The Viking Age brought great changes in Britain and Ireland, no less in Scotland than elsewhere, with the Vikings conquering and settling the islands and various mainland areas, including Caithness, Sutherland and Galloway. In the middle of the 9th century Ketil Flatnose is said to have founded the Kingdom of the Isles, governing many of these territories, and by the end of that century the Vikings had destroyed the Kingdom of Northumbria, greatly weakened the Kingdom of Strathclyde, and founded the Kingdom of York. In a major battle in 839, the Vikings killed the King of Fortriu, Eógan mac Óengusa, the King of Dál Riata Áed mac Boanta, and many others. In the aftermath, in the 840s, Cínaed mac Ailpín (Kenneth MacAlpin) became king of the Picts.

During the reign of Cínaed's grandson, Caustantín mac Áeda (900–943), outsiders began to refer to the region as the Kingdom of Alba rather than the Kingdom of the Picts, but it is not known whether this was because a new kingdom was established or Alba was simply a closer approximation of the Pictish name for the Picts. However, though the Pictish language did not disappear suddenly, a process of Gaelicisation (which may have begun generations earlier) was clearly underway during the reigns of Caustantín and his successors. By a certain point, probably during the 11th century, all the inhabitants of northern Alba had become fully Gaelicised Scots, and Pictish identity was forgotten. Later, the idea of Picts as a tribe was revived in myth and legend.

Kings and kingdoms

The early history of Pictland is unclear. In later periods multiple kings existed, ruling over separate kingdoms, with one king, sometimes two, more or less dominating their lesser neighbours. De Situ Albanie, a late document, the Pictish Chronicle, the Duan Albanach, along with Irish legends, have been used to argue the existence of seven Pictish kingdoms. These are: Cait, or Cat, situated in modern Caithness and Sutherland; Ce, situated in modern Mar and Buchan; Circin, perhaps situated in modern Angus and the Mearns; Fib, the modern Fife; Fidach, location unknown, but possibly near Inverness; Fotla, modern Atholl (Ath-Fotla); and Fortriu, cognate with the Verturiones of the Romans, recently shown to be centred on Moray

More small kingdoms may have existed. Some evidence suggests that a Pictish kingdom also existed in Orkney. De Situ Albanie is not the most reliable of sources, and the number of kingdoms, one for each of the seven sons of Cruithne, the eponymous founder of the Picts, may well be grounds enough for disbelief. Regardless of the exact number of kingdoms and their names, the Pictish nation was not a united one.

For most of Pictish recorded history the kingdom of Fortriu appears dominant, so much so that king of Fortriu and king of the Picts may mean one and the same thing in the annals. This was previously thought to lie in the area around Perth and southern Strathearn; however, recent work has convinced those working in the field that Moray (a name referring to a very much larger area in the High Middle Ages than the county of Moray) was the core of Fortriu.

The Picts are often said to have practised matrilineal kingship succession on the basis of Irish legends and a statement in Bede's history. The kings of the Picts when Bede was writing were Bridei and Nechtan, sons of Der Ilei, who indeed claimed the throne through their mother Der Ilei, daughter of an earlier Pictish king.

In Ireland, kings were expected to come from among those who had a great-grandfather who had been king. Kingly fathers were not frequently succeeded by their sons, not because the Picts practised matrilineal succession, but because they were usually followed by their own brothers or cousins (agnatic seniority), more likely to be experienced men with the authority and the support necessary to be king. This was similar to tanistry.

The nature of kingship changed considerably during the centuries of Pictish history. While earlier kings had to be successful war leaders to maintain their authority, kingship became rather less personalised and more institutionalised during this time. Bureaucratic kingship was still far in the future when Pictland became Alba, but the support of the church, and the apparent ability of a small number of families to control the kingship for much of the period from the later 7th century onwards, provided a considerable degree of continuity. In much the same period, the Picts' neighbours in Dál Riata and Northumbria faced considerable difficulties, as the stability of succession and rule that previously benefited them ended.

The later Mormaers are thought to have originated in Pictish times, and to have been copied from, or inspired by, Northumbrian usages. It is unclear whether the Mormaers were originally former kings, royal officials, or local nobles, or some combination of these. Likewise, the Pictish shires and thanages, traces of which are found in later times, are thought to have been adopted from their southern neighbours.

Society

The archaeological record provides evidence of the material culture of the Picts. It tells of a society not readily distinguishable from its 
British, Gaelic, or Anglo-Saxon neighbours. Although analogy and knowledge of other so-called 'Celtic' societies (a term they never used for themselves) may be a useful guide, these extended across a very large area. Relying on knowledge of pre-Roman Gaul, or 13th-century Ireland, as a guide to the Picts of the 6th century may be misleading if the analogy is pursued too far.

As with most peoples in the north of Europe in Late Antiquity, the Picts were farmers living in small communities. Cattle and horses were an obvious sign of wealth and prestige, sheep and pigs were kept in large numbers, and place names suggest that transhumance was common. Animals were small by later standards, although horses from Britain were imported into Ireland as breed-stock to enlarge native horses. From Irish sources, it appears that the elite engaged in competitive cattle-breeding for size, and this may have been the case in Pictland also. Carvings show hunting with dogs, and also, unlike in Ireland, with falcons. Cereal crops included wheat, barley, oats and rye. Vegetables included kale, cabbage, onions and leeks, peas and beans and turnips, and some types no longer common, such as skirret. Plants such as wild garlic, nettles and watercress may have been gathered in the wild. The pastoral economy meant that hides and leather were readily available. Wool was the main source of fibres for clothing, and flax was also common, although it is not clear if they grew it for fibres, for oil, or as a foodstuff. Fish, shellfish, seals, and whales were exploited along coasts and rivers. The importance of domesticated animals suggests that meat and milk products were a major part of the diet of ordinary people, while the elite would have eaten a diet rich in meat from farming and hunting.

No Pictish counterparts to the areas of denser settlement around important fortresses in Gaul and southern Britain, or any other significant urban settlements, are known. Larger, but not large, settlements existed around royal forts, such as at Burghead Fort, or associated with religious foundations. No towns are known in Scotland until the 12th century.

The technology of everyday life is not well recorded, but archaeological evidence shows it to have been similar to that in Ireland and Anglo-Saxon England. Recently evidence has been found of watermills in Pictland. Kilns were used for drying kernels of wheat or barley, not otherwise easy in the changeable, temperate climate.

The early Picts are associated with piracy and raiding along the coasts of Roman Britain. Even in the Late Middle Ages, the line between traders and pirates was unclear, so that Pictish pirates were probably merchants on other occasions. It is generally assumed that trade collapsed with the Roman Empire, but this is to overstate the case. There is only limited evidence of long-distance trade with Pictland, but tableware and storage vessels from Gaul, probably transported up the Irish Sea, have been found. This trade may have been controlled from Dunadd in Dál Riata, where such goods appear to have been common. While long-distance travel was unusual in Pictish times, it was far from unknown as stories of missionaries, travelling clerics and exiles show.

Brochs are popularly associated with the Picts. Although these were built earlier in the Iron Age, with construction ending around 100 AD, they remained in use into and beyond the Pictish period. Crannogs, which may originate in Neolithic Scotland, may have been rebuilt, and some were still in use in the time of the Picts. The most common sort of buildings would have been roundhouses and rectangular timbered halls. While many churches were built in wood, from the early 8th century, if not earlier, some were built in stone.

The Picts are often said to have tattooed themselves, but evidence for this is limited. Naturalistic depictions of Pictish nobles, hunters and warriors, male and female, without obvious tattoos, are found on monumental stones. These stones include inscriptions in Latin and ogham script, not all of which have been deciphered. The well-known Pictish symbols found on standing stones and other artifacts have defied attempts at translation over the centuries. Pictish art can be classed as "Celtic" and later as Insular. Irish poets portrayed their Pictish counterparts as very much like themselves.

Religion

Early Pictish religion is presumed to have resembled Celtic polytheism in general, although only place names remain from the pre-Christian era. When the Pictish elite converted to Christianity is uncertain, but traditions place Saint Palladius in Pictland after he left Ireland, and link Abernethy with Saint Brigid of Kildare. Saint Patrick refers to "apostate Picts", while the poem Y Gododdin does not remark on the Picts as pagans. Bede wrote that Saint Ninian (confused by some with Saint Finnian of Moville, who died c. 589), had converted the southern Picts. Recent archaeological work at Portmahomack places the foundation of the monastery there, an area once assumed to be among the last converted, in the late 6th century. This is contemporary with Bridei mac Maelchon and Columba, but the process of establishing Christianity throughout Pictland will have extended over a much longer period.

Pictland was not solely influenced by Iona and Ireland. It also had ties to churches in Northumbria, as seen in the reign of Nechtan mac Der Ilei. The reported expulsion of Ionan monks and clergy by Nechtan in 717 may have been related to the controversy over the dating of Easter, and the manner of tonsure, where Nechtan appears to have supported the Roman usages, but may equally have been intended to increase royal power over the church. Nonetheless, the evidence of place names suggests a wide area of Ionan influence in Pictland. Likewise, the Cáin Adomnáin (Law of Adomnán, Lex Innocentium) counts Nechtan's brother Bridei among its guarantors.

The importance of monastic centres in Pictland was not, perhaps, as great as in Ireland. In areas that have been studied, such as Strathspey and Perthshire, it appears that the parochial structure of the High Middle Ages existed in early medieval times. Among the major religious sites of eastern Pictland were Portmahomack, Cennrígmonaid (later St Andrews), Dunkeld, Abernethy and Rosemarkie. It appears that these are associated with Pictish kings, which argue for a considerable degree of royal patronage and control of the church. Portmahomack in particular has been the subject of recent excavation and research, published by Martin Carver.

The cult of saints was, as throughout Christian lands, of great importance in later Pictland. While kings might venerate great saints, such as Saint Peter in the case of Nechtan, and perhaps Saint Andrew in the case of the second Óengus mac Fergusa, many lesser saints, some now obscure, were important. The Pictish Saint Drostan appears to have had a wide following in the north in earlier times, although he was all but forgotten by the 12th century. Saint Serf of Culross was associated with Nechtan's brother Bridei. It appears, as is well known in later times, that noble kin groups had their own patron saints, and their own churches or abbeys.

Art

Pictish art appears on stones, metalwork and small objects of stone and bone. It uses a distinctive form of the general Celtic Early Medieval development of La Tène style with increasing influences from the Insular art of 7th and 8th century Ireland and Northumbria, and then Anglo-Saxon and Irish art as the Early Medieval period continues. The most conspicuous survivals are the many Pictish stones that are located all over Pictland, from Inverness to Lanarkshire. An illustrated catalogue of these stones was produced by J. Romilly Allen as part of The Early Christian Monuments of Scotland, with lists of their symbols and patterns. The symbols and patterns consist of animals including the Pictish Beast, the "rectangle", the "mirror and comb", "double-disc and Z-rod" and the "crescent and V-rod", among many others. There are also bosses and lenses with pelta and spiral designs. The patterns are curvilinear with hatchings. The cross-slabs are carved with Pictish symbols, Insular-derived interlace and Christian imagery, though interpretation is often difficult due to wear and obscurity. Several of the Christian images carved on various stones, such as David the harpist, Daniel and the lion, or scenes of St Paul and St Anthony meeting in the desert, have been influenced by the Insular manuscript tradition.

Pictish metalwork is found throughout Pictland (modern-day Scotland) and also further south; the Picts appeared to have a considerable amount of silver available, probably from raiding further south, or the payment of subsidies to keep them from doing so. The very large hoard of late Roman hacksilver found at Traprain Law may have originated in either way. The largest hoard of early Pictish metalwork was found in 1819 at Norrie's Law in Fife, but unfortunately much was dispersed and melted down (Scots law on treasure finds has always been unhelpful to preservation). Two famous 7th century silver and enamel plaques from the hoard, one shown above, have a "Z-rod", one of the Pictish symbols, in a particularly well-preserved and elegant form; unfortunately few comparable pieces have survived. Over ten heavy silver chains, some over 0.5m long, have been found from this period; the double-linked Whitecleuch Chain is one of only two that have a penannular linking piece for the ends, with symbol decoration including enamel, which shows how these were probably used as "choker" necklaces.

In the 8th and 9th centuries, after Christianization, the Pictish elite adopted a particular form of the Celtic brooch from Ireland, preferring true penannular brooches with lobed terminals. Some older Irish pseudo-penannular brooches were adapted to the Pictish style, for example, the Breadalbane Brooch (British Museum). The St Ninian's Isle Treasure contains the best collection of Pictish forms. Other characteristics of Pictish metalwork are dotted backgrounds or designs and animal forms influenced by Insular art. The 8th century Monymusk Reliquary has elements of Pictish and Irish styles.

Language

The Pictish language is extinct. Evidence is limited to place names, personal names, and contemporary records in other languages. The evidence of place-names and personal names may suggest that the Picts spoke Insular Celtic languages related to the more southerly Brittonic languages. It is possible that Pictish diverged significantly from the Southern Neo-Brittonic dialects due to the lack of influence of Latin. The absence of surviving written material in Pictish, discounting the enigmatic Ogham inscriptions, does not indicate a pre-literate society. The church certainly required literacy in Latin, and could not function without copyists to produce liturgical documents. Pictish iconography shows books being read, and carried, and its naturalistic style gives every reason to suppose that such images were of real life. Literacy was not widespread, but among the senior clergy, and in monasteries, it would have been common enough.

Toponymic evidence also indicates the advance of Gaelic into Pictland. As noted, Atholl, meaning New Ireland, is attested in the early 8th century. This may be an indication of the advance of Gaelic. Fortriu also contains place names suggesting Gaelic settlement, or Gaelic influences. A pre-Gaelic interpretation of the name as Athfocla meaning 'north pass' or 'north way', as in gateway to Moray, suggests that the Gaelic Athfotla may be a Gaelic misreading of the minuscule c for t.

A number of Ogham inscriptions are present on Pictish stones and from archaeology from Pictish areas. These were argued by influential linguist Kenneth Jackson to be unintelligible as Celtic and evidence for the coexistence of a non-Celtic language in Pictish times. Celtic interpretations have since been advanced for some of these inscriptions, but the nature of the inscriptions continues to be a matter of debate.

See also

 List of Celtic tribes
 Origins of the Kingdom of Alba
 Painted pebbles
 Picts in fantasy
 Picts in literature and popular culture
 Prehistoric Scotland
 St Andrews Sarcophagus

References

Citations

General bibliography 

 

 

 

.

r

Further reading 
 James E. Fraser, The New Edinburgh History of Scotland Vol. 1 - From Caledonia To Pictland, Edinburgh University Press (2009), 
 Henderson, George; Henderson, Isabel, The Art of the Picts, Thames and Hudson (2004), 
 Fraser Hunter, Beyond the Edge of Empire: Caledonians, Picts and Romans, Groam House Museum, Rosemarkie (2007), 
 Alex Woolf, The New Edinburgh History of Scotland Vol. 2: From Pictland to Alba, Edinburgh University Press (2007),

External links

 Glasgow University ePrints server, including Katherine Forsyth's
 Language in Pictland (pdf) and
 Literacy in Pictland (pdf)
 "The language of the Picts", article by Paul Kavanagh, 2012-02-04
 CELT: Corpus of Electronic Texts at University College Cork
 The Corpus of Electronic Texts includes the Annals of Ulster, Tigernach, the Four Masters and Innisfallen, the Chronicon Scotorum, the Lebor Bretnach, Genealogies, and various Saints' Lives. Most are translated into English, or translations are in progress
 Scotland Royalty
 The Chronicle of the Kings of Alba
 Annals of Clonmacnoise at Cornell
 Bede's Ecclesiastical History and its Continuation (pdf), at CCEL, translated by A.M. Sellar.
 Annales Cambriae (translated) at the Internet Medieval Sourcebook.

 Proceedings of the Society of Antiquaries of Scotland (PSAS) through 1999 (pdf).
 Tarbat Discovery Programme with reports on excavations at Portmahomack.
 SPNS the Scottish Place-Name Society (Comann Ainmean-Áite na h-Alba), including commentary on and extracts from Watson's The History of the Celtic Place-names of Scotland.
 The Picts and Scots in history
 Historic Scotland website on Pictish stones
 Ancient Scotland: Caledonia and Pictavia
 The Picts- A Learning Resource A general history of the Picts and education resource for schools produced by the Scottish Forestry Commission

 
Barbarian kingdoms
Extinct ethnic groups
Historical Celtic peoples